South Hobart/Sandy Bay Cricket Club (SHSBCC), also known as "The Sharks", is a Grade level cricket club representing both South Hobart and Sandy Bay in Tasmania's Grade Cricket Competition. The club was formed by a merger of two previous clubs from each of these suburbs.

SHSBCC play their home games at Queenborough, in Sandy Bay, Hobart.

South Hobart were very successful in the 1930s winning multiple premierships over the decade. Post war, both clubs had limited success at the 1st grade level with their last premierships coming in the 1979-80 & 1980/81 seasons. Ultimately, South Hobart and Sandy Bay amalgamated in August 1987 forming the South Hobart Sandy Bay Cricket Club.

After many unsuccessful attempts at winning the overall men's 1st grade premiership, the Sharks won in the 2015–16 season defeating Kingborough CC in the three day final. The Sharks then went back to back the next season in 2016-17 defeating North Hobart CC. Coincidentally, they also won the second grade premierships in both years also.

SHSBCC has been lucky enough over the years to be the home of current and former Australian players; George Bailey, Xavier Doherty, Ben Dunk and Alex Doolan along with a host of recent Tasmanian and Hobart Hurricane contracted cricketers; Sean Willis, Gabe Bell, Simon Milenko, Travis Birt, Matt Johnson, Hamish Kingston & Tim Van Der Gugten.

The clubs strong junior development has seen a host of young players represent Tasmania at a junior level. Over 80 juniors are currently playing for the club. Their junior program was awarded the Tasmania Junior Program of the Year Award in 2018–19 in the 'A Sport for All' awards.

Honours
TCA Premierships: South Hobart (8) 1931–32,1935–36,1936–37,1937–38,1944–45,1958–59,1959–60,1979-80. Sandy Bay (3) 1943–44,1945–46,1980-81.

SHSBCC (2) 2015–16, 2016–17

External links
 SHSBCC Website

Tasmanian grade cricket clubs
1987 establishments in Australia
Cricket clubs established in 1987
Sandy Bay, Hobart
Sport in Hobart